Exercise Malabar is a naval exercise involving the United States, Japan and India as permanent partners. The annual Malabar exercises includes diverse activities, ranging from fighter combat operations from aircraft carriers through maritime interdiction operations, anti-submarine warfare, diving salvage operations, amphibious operations, counter-piracy operations, cross–deck helicopter landings and anti–air warfare operations. Over the years, the exercise has been conducted in the Philippine Sea, off the coast of Japan, the Persian Gulf, in the Bay of Bengal and the Arabian Sea. It is taken care by the Asian and the North American Commands.

The exercise started in 1992 along the Malabar Coast as a bilateral exercise between India and the United States. It was expanded in 2007 with the participation of Japan, Singapore and Australia. Japan became a permanent partner in 2015. Australia participated in the exercise again in 2020, marking the second time that the Quad will be jointly participating in a military exercise. The aim of the exercise includes increasing interoperability between the naval forces.

The duration of the exercise has ranged from 1 to 11 sea-days. The complexity and sophistication of the exercise has increased over the years. Exercises have on-shore and at-sea stages. The average participation by India increased from 8 ships to just over 9 from 2002 to 2014.

Coast guard vessels have also taken part. Aircraft have included the P3C Orion, Poseidon P8I, Tupolev Tu-142,  Kawasaki P-1, ShinMaywa US-2, F/A 18 Super Hornets, Jaguars, Sea Harrier jets and Sea King helicopters. Special forces have also taken part.

1992–2002 
The first Malabar exercise between India and the United States was held on 28/29 May 1992. The exercises were located along the Malabar Coast in Cochin, headquarters of the Indian Southern Naval Command, and Goa. It was of an elementary level, including four vessels, passing exercises and basic maneuvers. Two more exercises were conducted before 1998, when the Americans suspended exercises after India tested nuclear weapons.

2002–2007 

The United States renewed military contact following the 2001 September 11 attacks when India joined President George W Bush's campaign against international terrorism. The 2003 exercises featured sub-surface exercises for the first time. In 2005 India and US signed the New Framework for the India - U.S. Defence Relationship. Malabar 2005 saw the inclusion of aircraft carriers from both navies for the first time. 2006 was the first time expeditionary exercises took place with a United States Expeditionary Strike Group (ESG) leading the exercise. Malabar 2007 was the first time three aircraft carriers took part.

In 2007, the Quadrilateral Security Dialogue, an initiative between Japan, United States, Australia and India impacted the Malabar exercise. In 2007, for the first time, navies other than Indian and US joined the exercise with the armada including Japan, Singapore and Australia. Also for the first time, the exercise was shifted from the Indian Ocean to the Pacific Ocean.

India's Left Front parties that have criticised Prime Minister Manmohan Singh's government on the India-US civilian nuclear deal had vehemently protested the exercise, seeing it as another sign of the growing closeness between the two countries. At one time, the Indian government was known to have considered postponing or canceling the exercise but the Indian Navy put its foot down, saying the logistics involved made any delay impossible. Protests against  were seen in India when it dropped anchor off Chennai in July.

China, which did off not officially comment on the exercise, was known to be unhappy over the event as it was being conducted in the Bay of Bengal for the first time. China has been cultivating naval cooperation with Bangladesh and Myanmar to gain access to the Bay of Bengal and has been strengthening military cooperation with Sri Lanka. In June, China had issued a 'demarche' to India, United States, Japan and Australia seeking details about their four-nation meeting, termed a Quadrilateral Initiative. India and Australia had quickly assured Beijing that security and defence issues did not form part of the meeting's agenda.

2008–2014 

Domestic political changes in Australia and Japan, as well as China's opposition, resulted in Malabar 2008 being on a much smaller scale with only participation from India and the US, and being conducted in the Indian Ocean. Some protests in India against the 2008 exercise were led by the Communist Party of India (Marxist).

While the 2009 exercises were trilateral, India did not participate in the amphibious assault exercise in Japan.

India had stopped involving more countries in the exercises after China, in 2007, sent demarches to all the participants of a five-nation naval exercise held in the Bay of Bengal. With the Japanese participation in 2009 raising no political storm, India was once again agreeable to the idea of allowing the JMSDF to participate.

The Tōhoku earthquake and tsunami on the east coast of Japan in March 2011 caused Japan to back out of the next Malabar which was held off the Okinawa coast.

2015–2019 

On 26 January 2015, the U.S. President and Indian Prime Minister agreed, in a joint statement, to upgrade exercise Malabar. India invited Japan to be a part of exercise, held in the Bay of Bengal. Japan joined as a permanent member.

In 2015, the United States brought up the fact that India was doing its "bare minimum" with regard the participation in the exercise. However, seeming to understand India's limitation, the United States has also responded accordingly. For India, one of the reasons for converting Malabar into a multilateral exercise has been "resource optimisation". As the number of maritime bilateral exercises over the years has been increasing, the Navy's resources are heavily strained. Further, the returns from the international exercises seem to be levelling out. Inviting China to "socialise" during the Malabar exercises has been suggested.

The 2018 Malabar exercise was conducted from 7 to 16 June 2018 off the coast of Guam in the Philippine Sea. This was the 22nd edition of the exercise and the first time it was held on United States territory. The exercise is divided into two phases. The harbor phase was held from 7 to 10 June at Naval Base Guam, and the sea phase from 11 to 16 June. Based on news reports, India refused Australia participation in the exercise to avoid posturing it as a military group against China.

2020–present 

Malabar 2020 was a "non-contact, at sea only" exercise taking into consideration COVID-19 pandemic. It was decided that Australia shall also be a part of the Malabar Naval exercise, in view to support a free, open and rule based Indo Pacific. This is the first time that all four navies of the Quad will be in a joint exercise in 13 years. US Deputy Secretary of State Stephen E Biegun, on 20 October 2020, said that Quad should be "more regularised", and at some point "formalised" with the passage of time.

It was reported in the Sunday Telegraph on 7 March 2021 that France planned to join the four other nations in 2021, and had planned its annual Jeanne d'Arc naval exercise around this event.

See also

 Geostrategy
 AirSea Battle
Interoperability
 Blue Team (U.S. politics)
 China containment policy
 India–United States relations
 List of disputed territories of China
 Quadrilateral Security Dialogue
 String of Pearls (Indian Ocean)
 Territorial disputes in the South China Sea
 US-Philippines Balikatan Exercise

 International relations
 India-China relations
China-United States relations
 India-Australia relations
 India-Japan relations
 India–United States relations

Notes

References

Military exercises involving the United States
Indian naval exercises
Indian military exercises
India–United States military relations
India–Japan military relations
Japan–United States military relations